Wind power is a growing source of electricity in Poland. In 2019, wind was the second most important source of electricity produced in Poland, after coal, and accounted for about 10% of the electricity production.

History
From 2012 to 2014 the Nowy Tomyśl Wind Turbines were the tallest wind turbines in the world with a pinnacle height of 210 metres. They are still the tallest wind turbines installed on lattice towers.

 the Polish government was still considering whether the first nuclear power plant should be built, but in May 2018 state-owned PGE Polska Grupa Energetyczna, who would have carried out any build, chose to invest in offshore wind power instead, targeting the build of 2.5 GW by 2030.

In September 2020, the government announced a 130 billion zloty (£26.5 billion) plan to invest in offshore wind. The total wind power grid-connected capacity in Poland was 8,255.9 MW as of 31 December 2022.

Capacity and production

As of the end of 2015, total installed capacity was 5.1 gigawatts (GW), which provided 10,858 gigawatt-hours (GW·h) — around 6.22% of the electricity consumed in the country. By year end 2016 total installed capacity had risen to 5,782 MW.

Energy production sources are also registered by the state Energy Regulatory Office (URE).

List of Polish wind farms
Some of the points of production are:

Projects
Projects of 1.2 GW offshore wind farm are under development near Slupsk.

See also 
 Renewable energy in Poland
 Solar power in Poland
 Renewable energy by country

References

External links 
 Polish Wind Energy Association (Polskie Stowarzyszenie Energetyki Wiatrowej; PSEW)

Energy in Poland
 
Poland